Carlos Cruz González, usually known simply as Carlos Cruz (1 June 1930 – 27 April 2018), was a Spanish comics artist.

In the 1950s, he worked in Buenos Aires as a cover illustrator and cartoonist, before moving to Málaga in the 1960s, where he began working for British firm Fleetway Publications on their British comics. His work appeared in Eagle, Lion, Tiger, Buster, Smash! and others. His most significant work in British comics was his three-year stint on the series Dan Dare in the relaunched Eagle from 1985 to 1988. Between 1988 and 2003, he worked on The Phantom in Sweden.

Bibliography

1947–1948: Chatin supplement of The Late Movement Press, Málaga
1956: Lightning Red and Misterix, in the Just Cartoon Colt, Buenos Aires
1960–1962: Sergeant Kirk
1962–1963: Santos Palma, in SuperMisterix, EY, Buenos Aires
1964: The Shrinker's Revenge, in Buster (from III-64), Fleetway
1964: Mighty McGinty, in Buster (from VI-64), Fleetway — reprinted in Smash! in 1970–1971 as The Fighting Three
1965: Battling Boffins, in Tiger (from IV-65), Fleetway
1965: Sergeant Rock — Paratrooper, in Tiger and Hurricane (from VI-65), Fleetway — reprinted in Smash! in 1970–1971 as The Fighting Three
1966: When the Sky Turned Green and various series, in The Champion, Fleetway
1966:  Robot Builders, in Tiger, Fleetway
1968: Marvel's Mighty Multi-Gun, in B, (from X-68), Fleetway
1969: Crabbe's Crusaders, in Buster, Fleetway
1969: Roamin' James – Space Pilot, in Buster and Giggle (from IV-69), Fleetway
1970: The Pillater Peril and various other series, in Smash!, IPC
1971: Sniper war comic, DC Thomson
1971: Dr Mesmer's Revenge, in Lion, Fleetway
1971–1972: Juanjo, in Trinca, Doncel
1973: The Executioner and Murderer, Memories, Bruguera, in SuperMortadelo
1974: Union Jack Jackson, in Warlord (from IX-74), DC Thomson
1974: Pauline, in Melanie (from IV-74), Fleetway/IPC
1975: Wendy, various stories, Fleetway/IPC
1982: M.A.S.K., Fleetway/IPC
1983: School of Dark Secrets and various series, in Princess, Fleetway/IPC
1984:  Bloodfang and various series, in Eagle, Fleetway/IPC
1985–1988: "Dan Dare: Pilot of the Future, in Eagle and Tiger, Fleetway/IPC (in colour)
1988–2003: The Phantom'' (beginning in #15 (IV-1988), Egmont/Bulls, Stockholm

Further reading
Obituary by Ulf Granberg, at Chronicle Chamber, 25 May 2018. (Retrieved 18 June 2018.)

References

Citations

Sources 
Lambiek.net
Cruz's homepage (in Spanish)

Spanish comics artists
1930 births
2018 deaths
20th-century Spanish artists
Spanish cartoonists